Seyratepe is a station on the M2 line of the Istanbul Metro. It is the western terminus of the  Seyrantepe branch of the line, with shuttle trains operating back and forth, to Sanayi. The most notable structure near the station is the Nef Stadium, the home stadium of Galatasaray S.K.; located adjacent to the station on the other side of the Istanbul Outer Beltway.
Seyrantepe station, along with the Seyrantepe branch, opened on 11 November 2010.

Layout

References

External links
Seyrantepe in Google Street View

Railway stations opened in 2010
2010 establishments in Turkey
Istanbul metro stations
Sarıyer